Pisces–Eridanus stellar stream is a close stellar stream, between 80 and 226 parsecs away, and stretching 120° across the sky, an open cluster that was stretched apart by past gravitational interactions. By analysis of the highest mass member stars, it is estimated to be only 120 million years old, a similar age to the Pleiades.

Stars
The stream includes at least 6 naked eye stars: Lambda Tauri at 3.5 magnitude, 148 parsec distance; Omicron Aquarii at 4.7 magnitude, 134 parsec distance; 106 Aquarii at 5.2 magnitude, 114 parsec distance; 108 Aquarii at 5.2 magnitude, 98 parsec distance; Tau1 Aquarii at 5.7 magnitude, 97 parsec distance; and Nu Fornacis at 4.7 magnitude and 114 parsec distance.

See also
 List of stellar streams

References

 Extended stellar systems in the solar neighborhood II. Discovery of a nearby 120° stellar stream in GaiaDR2 Stefan Meingast, João Alves, and Verena Fürnkranz. 17 January 2019
 Image of the Week: A river of stars

Stellar streams
Stellar associations